Intertek Group plc is a British multinational assurance, inspection, product testing and certification company headquartered in London, England. It is listed on the London Stock Exchange and is a constituent of the FTSE 100 Index.

History
Intertek traces its origins from a marine surveying business formed by Caleb Brett in the 1890s, a testing laboratory formed by Milton Hersey in Montreal in 1888 and a lamp testing centre established by Thomas Edison in 1896. These businesses were all acquired by Inchcape plc during the 1980s and early 1990s.

In 1996, Inchcape Testing Services was acquired by Charterhouse Capital Partners and was renamed Intertek.

In 2000, the Company was divested by Charterhouse and was listed in 2002 on the London Stock Exchange. In April 2010, Intertek acquired Ciba Expert Services’ Environmental, Safety, & Testing and Regulatory businesses, including Cantox Health Sciences (Cantox) and Ashuren Health Sciences (Ashuren).

On 19 September 2007, Intertek announced its acquisition of National Software Testing Laboratories.

In April 2011, the company acquired Moody International.

In May 2021, Intertek acquired SAI Global's Assurance and Standards Business units.

Operations
Intertek Consumer Goods and Retail is the largest tester of consumer goods in the world and has a network of more than 1,000 laboratories across around 100 countries.

The company has more than 44,000 employees across 100 countries in over 1,000 locations including large-scaled offices and testing facilities in New York City, London and Hong Kong. Centered around its laboratory testing services, the company provides quality and safety assurance to industries such as construction, healthcare, food and transport. Products tested include batteries, accessories, apparel and chemicals.

Leadership
On 16 May 2015, André Lacroix succeeded Wolfhart Hauser as CEO of the company.

See also

 ETL SEMKO

References

External links
 

British companies established in 1885
Companies based in the City of Westminster
Product-testing organizations
Companies listed on the London Stock Exchange